LiberoGrande is a 1997 arcade game by Namco. It was converted for the Sony PlayStation in 1998.

A typical arcade football game in its nature, LiberoGrande introduced a novelty factor previously found in Namco's Top Striker for the Nintendo Entertainment System: the ability to play as just one player, instead of controlling the whole team, always swapping for players nearer the ball. This idea was later used by Konami in Winning Eleven/Pro Evolution Soccer titles in the Become a Legend mode, and by EA Sports in its various sports game franchises with the name Be a Pro.

Gameplay
The player starts to choose one of the star players, and then a national team. Each star player, based on a real football player but with changed names, except for initials (Zinedine Zidane is Zenon Zadkine, for instance) is rated in both ball skill, speed and shooting abilities.

In addition to the original arcade mode, the home release adds an International mode (basically, the FIFA World Cup format), a league competition (up to eight star players/teams), which can be all human controlled and a skills mode where the player has to complete several training ground tasks such as hitting a target floating in the goal mouth or hitting an area from distance.

The player roster in the arcade version consists of:

 (Hidden player)
 (Hidden player)
 (Hidden player)
 (Hidden player)
 (Hidden player)
 (Hidden player)
 (Hidden player)
 (Hidden player)
 (Hidden player)
 (Hidden player)

There is a total of 48 national teams, but only 32 of them to choose from, depending on which version:

North America
a
b

South America

ab
a

Africa

b

b
b

Europe

bc
bc
a

a
c

c

ac
bc
c
bc

ac
c
bc

Asia
a
a
b

a
ab

a Only playable in the Arcade version
b Only playable in the Japanese version
c Only playable in the PAL version

A sequel, LiberoGrande 2 (known as LiberoGrande International in Europe) was released for PlayStation in Europe and Japan only, but with less success than the first title.

A playable demo of the game was included in Ridge Racer Turbo (Ridge Racer Hi-Spec in Europe), which was sold with Ridge Racer Type 4. The demo includes three players (Zenon Zadkine, Alfred Shaffer and Jordan Krüger) and three teams (England, France and Italy), which a person could use to play a ten-minute game.

Reception 

In Japan, Game Machine listed LiberoGrande on their February 15, 1998 issue as being the seventh most-successful arcade game of the month.

References

External links

1997 video games
Arcade video games
Association football video games
Bandai Namco Entertainment franchises
Namco games
PlayStation (console) games
Multiplayer and single-player video games
Video games developed in Japan